"Dos Oruguitas" ("Two Little Caterpillars") is a  Spanish-language song from Disney's 2021 computer-animated musical feature film Encanto. Released by Walt Disney Records as part of the film's soundtrack on November 19, 2021, the song was written by American musician Lin-Manuel Miranda and performed by Colombian singer-songwriter Sebastián Yatra.

The song is played in the film over a flashback depicting the life and death of Pedro Madrigal, the grandfather of Encanto protagonist Mirabel. The lyrics are in Spanish, but an English-language version of the song, titled "Two Oruguitas", plays over the end credits. Music critics praised the song for its sentiment, production, lyrics, and Yatra's vocal performance, and often named it as the best song from Encanto. Commercially, "Dos Oruguitas" entered the top 40 of the US Billboard Hot 100 and marked Yatra's first-ever appearance on the chart. The song was nominated for Best Original Song at the 94th Academy Awards.

Background and release

Encanto is an American computer-animated musical fantasy film, the 60th film by Walt Disney Animation Studios. The song is featured as the sixth track on the film's soundtrack. It was written and composed by American singer-songwriter Lin-Manuel Miranda, who also wrote the seven other songs of the soundtrack. He previously worked on Disney's 2016 animated film, Moana, as well. It is sung by Sebastián Yatra, who grew up in the US but was born in Colombia. He was invited to join the Encanto soundtrack and sing the song after Miranda heard Yatra's song "Adiós".

Composition and development

"Dos Oruguitas" was the first song Miranda wrote completely in Spanish. This amount of Spanish was far outside his comfort zone. Miranda said "It was important to me that I write it in Spanish, rather than write it in English and translate it, because you can always feel translation". His goal was to write a Colombian folk song that "felt like it [had] always existed," which he thought would make the painful family history depicted in the accompanying animated sequence easier to watch. He was inspired in particular by composers Antônio Carlos Jobim and Joan Manuel Serrat.

The song and accompanying sequence were originally planned to be in the prologue, but the filmmaking team decided they would fit better toward the end of the film.

Lyrics and context
"Dos Oruguitas" is a non-diegetic song, which plays during a flashback. In this flashback, Mirabel learns about her grandmother's Alma's past and the hardship she went through: her romance with her husband Pedro, and how Pedro's self-sacrifice when they were fleeing a war allowed Alma to escape. This story helps reconcile Mirabel and her grandmother. Co-director Byron Howard said about the song: "It's probably the most critical bit of musical storytelling in the whole film because it has to do with the history of the family and Mirabel understanding her grandmother." The song itself is about two caterpillars falling in love and having to let each other go, which is a metaphor for the events in Pedro and Alma's lives.

Reception

Critical reviews
Billboard critics dubbed "We Don't Talk About Bruno" as the most memorable track from Encanto, but picked "Dos Oruguitas" as the best track for being a heartfelt ballad with "emotional resonance and beautiful sentimentality". TheWrap Drew Taylor also ranked it as the best song, saying that even without the accompanying visuals, "the song will still make you sob, whether you know Spanish or not." /Film critic Caroline Cao ranked it as the second-best song, describing it as "an elegy that honors what's been lost, even as it emboldens the survivors to find their way forward, carrying on those memories".

Commercial performance
"Dos Oruguitas" debuted on the US Billboard Hot 100 chart at number 83, marking Yatra's first ever appearance on the chart. It eventually ascended to number 36. The song peaked at number 2 on the US Hot Latin Songs chart.

Accolades

Charts

Weekly charts

Year-end charts

Certifications

References

2020s ballads
2021 songs
Songs written by Lin-Manuel Miranda
Sebastián Yatra songs
Walt Disney Records singles
Songs written for animated films
Songs from Encanto
Spanish-language songs
Folk ballads
Folk songs
Songs about death
Songs about insects